Moyo (older spelling Mojo) is an island in Indonesia's West Nusa Tenggara province. It is off the north coast of Sumbawa Island, and has an area of 349 km2.
Moyo Island is located in Sumbawa Regency within the Nusa Tenggara province, just north of Sumbawa. The island has an area of 32,044 hectares, about 8° south of the equator. The island is proposed as part of Moyo Satonda National Park along with Satonda Island.

The island is mostly uninhabited and unknown to the majority of tourists; the population is about 1000 inhabitants distributed in 6 villages, all of them living on fishing and farming.
In 1986 a National park was established in order to conserve and protect the extraordinary vegetation, its uniqueness and the many animal species (birds, bats, monkeys, wild pigs, deer) and a Marine Reserve with the goal of preserving the unspoiled reefs surrounding the island.

Nature reserve

Most of Moyo is a nature reserve called Moyo Island Hunting Park covering  (Decree of Minister of Forestry Number: 308/Kpts-II/1986 dated 29 September 1986), and is inhabited by macaques, wild cattle, wild pigs, barking deer, deer (Cervus timorensis) and several varieties of birds.
The National Park is home to long tail macaques (Macaca fascicularis), wild bovines, wild pigs, deer (Cervus timorensis) and 21 bat species, including flying foxes.
Bird watching enthusiasts can observe 86 species of birds, 2 of them endangered: the yellow-headed parrot and the Tanimbar Megapode bird (Megapodium tenimberensis) which is endemic to Indonesia. It nests in large sandy heaps, litter and other debris, where the heat generated by the decomposition of the organic material serves to incubate the eggs.
Inside the Park there are also a few waterfalls, the biggest one is about 2 hours from Labuan Aji village, the others are within 15 minutes walking distance, in the forest frequented by a multitude of colorful butterflies.
Recently, the entire coastline of Moyo Island has been declared a marine conservation area. The coral reefs and their inhabitants are now protected from fishing and pollution.

These two natural reserves are managed by an Office of Natural Conservation of West Nusa Tenggara, as a Technical Operation Unit of Directorate General of Forest Protection and Nature Conservation-Ministry of Forestry.

References

External links

Lesser Sunda Islands
Islands of West Nusa Tenggara
Populated places in Indonesia